George Gregory Roussas (born June 29, 1933) is a Greek-American professor emeritus in statistics at University of California, Davis. He is noted for his contributions in asymptotic statistics and stochastic processes.

Education and career 
Roussas was born in the central Greece region of Phthiotis. He studied mathematics at University of Athens in Greece and received his BSc in 1956. Afterwards, he moved to the USA, studying for a PhD in statistics at University of California, Berkeley under the supervision of David Blackwell and Lucien Le Cam. He received his PhD from Berkeley in 1964.

Roussas started his academic career in the statistics faculty at San Jose State University in 1964 as an assistant professor. He then moved to University of Wisconsin–Madison in 1966, where he progressed from an assistant professor to a full professor in 1972. During this time, he also took up administrative position at University of Patras and University of Crete in his home country, Greece. Roussas moved to University of California, Davis in 1985 and took up the Chair in the Department of Statistics. He became distinguished Professor at University of California, Davis in 2003 and retired there in 2012.

Honors and awards 
Roussas became a Fellow of the Royal Statistical Society in 1975, a Fellow of the Institute of Mathematical Statistics in 1983, a Fellow of the American Statistical Association in 1986, and a Fellow of the American Association for the Advancement of Science in 2010.

Bibliography

References 

1933 births

Living people
National and Kapodistrian University of Athens alumni
University of California, Berkeley alumni
University of California, Davis faculty
University of Wisconsin–Madison faculty
San Jose State University faculty
Academic staff of the University of Patras
Mathematical statisticians
Greek mathematicians
20th-century Greek mathematicians
American statisticians
People from Spercheiada
Textbook writers